North Yorkshire Fire and Rescue Service is the statutory fire and rescue service covering the seven districts of administrative county of North Yorkshire: Craven, Harrogate, Hambleton, Richmondshire, Ryedale, Scarborough, Selby; as well as the unitary authority of City of York.
It is divided into eight groups related to the above districts.

Performance
In 2018/2019, every fire and rescue service in England and Wales was subjected to a statutory inspection by His Majesty's Inspectorate of Constabulary and Fire & Rescue Services (HIMCFRS). The inspection investigated how well the service performs in each of three areas. On a scale of outstanding, good, requires improvement and inadequate, North Yorkshire Fire and Rescue Service was rated as follows:

History
Like all areas of the country, independent fire brigades developed in towns and cities across England which catered for the immediate area and were sponsored by the local authority. Examples within North Yorkshire were the Scarborough Fire Brigade, the Whitby Town Fire Brigade, and Pocklington Town Fire Brigade, which were merged in 1948 into the North Riding Fire Brigade. York had a separate professional fire brigade instituted in 1940 (under a Fire act of 1938), which was subsumed into the North Yorkshire Fire and Rescue Service in 1996 when the City of York Council and the North Yorkshire Fire Authority combined their efforts into one fire authority. In 1947, the North Riding Fire Brigade had three divisions; Eston (A), Northallerton (B) and Scarborough (C).

Fire stations and services have fluctuated with changing council and local authority areas and with cutbacks to the fire service itself. The North Riding Fire Brigade lost some of its most northern areas around Guisborough and Saltburn to the newly formed Teesside Fire service in 1968. Teesside later became Cleveland Fire Brigade. In the 1970s, the brigade closed Whixley fire station near Boroughbridge, and in 2013, Snainton fire station near Scarborough was closed too. Cover would be supplied from nearby Whitby and Scarborough fire stations.

In 2016, in line with other fire and police force mergers, a proposal was put forward that North Yorkshire Fire and Rescue merge with the Humberside Fire and Rescue Service. However, the proposal was not backed by the leaders of county councils and emergency commissioners from the Humberside operating area, and so the merger proposal was shelved.

In 2018, the North Yorkshire Police and Crime Commissioner, Julia Mulligan, also took on the role of fire commissioner for North Yorkshire.
In October 2021, the incumbent commissioner Philip Allott resigned following comments surrounding the murder of Sarah Everard.

Stations

The service has a total of 38 fire stations. The majority of these are crewed by retained firefighters, with the minority being wholetime or day-crewed. North Yorkshire also has two fire stations which are crewed by volunteers. The breakdown of station crewing is:

 Five wholetime shift fire stations
 Seven wholetime day-crewed stations
 24 retained stations
 Two volunteer-crewed stations

In addition to the fire stations, there are a headquarters and control room in Northallerton and a training centre in Easingwold. The fire service also shares the transport and logistics hub in Thirsk with North Yorkshire Police.

Incidents and statistics
The FRS received a total number of 19,000 emergency calls in 2007, as well as this the service also dealt with 9,000 incidents that year. Additionally, the service experienced a drop in call-outs by 32% between 2003 and 2013. The total number of incidents attended in the 2014-15 year was 6,874, of which 3,777 were false alarms.

By 2016, this had dropped to 15,000 and received notoriety when a crew in Harrogate was delayed in getting to a car fire after it emerged they had been sent to the wrong location by a control room in Cornwall. NYFRS shares its control room operations with the Cornwall Fire and Rescue Service during peak periods. A later investigation determined that the mix-up was down to the caller not supplying timely information rather than the Cornish operator not having 'local' knowledge.

Notable incidents
9 July 1984  York Minster fire - 150 firefighters from across North Yorkshire fought the blaze which caused over £1 million worth of damage and was believed to have been caused by lightning
24 May 1995  Dunkeswick air crash
28 December 1996  an explosion at a gas bottling plant in Aiskew near Bedale, resulted in flames shooting  in the air and the evacuation of 200 people. A gas engineer and the fire service turned off the valves and managed to extinguish the fire. At its height, the response from the NYF&RS was 80 firefighters and 18 appliances
10 August 2021  a fire at Bilsdale transmitting station involved eight pumps from across North Yorkshire

See also
 Fire Service in the United Kingdom
 Fire apparatus
 Fire Engine
 FiReControl
 List of British firefighters killed in the line of duty

References

External links
 
North Yorkshire Fire and Rescue Service at HMICFRS

Fire and rescue services of England